Richard Juan (: ; born 2 August 1992), also known as Richard Juan and Richard Hwan, is a Chinese Filipino TV personality, actor, host and entrepreneur who was raised in Hong Kong, but later moved back to the Philippines where he was born and holds citizenship to. He first gained popularity through Eat Bulaga! "You're My Foreignoy" and won the Dabarkad's Choice Award.

He was also one of the regular housemates of Pinoy Big Brother: 737.

Life and career

Early life and educational background
Richard Juan was born on August 2, 1992 in the Philippines. Though a permanent Hong Kong resident, Juan still holds Filipino citizenship. When he was only a month old, their family moved to Hong Kong. There, he completed high school education in Island School. Juan then returned to the Philippines to continue his studies and graduated cum laude with a degree in Broadcast Communication at the University of the Philippines, Diliman, Quezon City. Juan is multilingual; aside from his native Cantonese, he is fluent in Filipino, English, Mandarin and Hokkien.

Modelling career
Before he became a TV personality, Juan worked as a part-time model. He started modelling inside the campus for school event posters. Eventually, he had his first modelling stint via Philippine Fashion Week: Spring Summer 2014. Succeeding months saw him walking for several fashion shows including Shangri-la Plaza Mall, Coca-Cola and Adidas. Simultaneously, he also did shoots with newspapers (Philippine Inquirer) and fashion magazines like Candy, Chalk Magazine, Sparkling Magazine, and Garage Magazine. Juan also had his first campaign shoot with SM Youth in early 2014 at Pico de Loro.

In 2013, Juan was part of the Candy magazine's list of Top 20 Candy Cuties where he was ranked as the 14th Candy Cutie. In 2014, he was part of Chalk magazine's Bright Young Manila Campus Hotties and won the UAAP division. In January 2015, he became an ambassador for Smart Telecom and also Systema. In February of the same year, he was officially launched as one of the SM Youth Ambassadors.

Television career: You're My Foreignoy
In January 2014, Eat Bulaga! announced a new segment entitled "You're My Foreignoy" ("Foreignoy" is a portmanteau of "foreigner" and "Pinoy"). It is a contest for foreigners, who are currently living in the Philippines, who claim to have a heart of a true Filipino.

Juan joined the contest in its second week where he won the daily round. Instantly, he became a crowd favorite. He then competed with foreigners from different countries including the rumored ex-boyfriend of Lindsay Lohan, Christian Arno Williams during the second weekly finals. Juan lost to Christian but he won the Dabarkad's Choice Award (People's Choice Award). He trended among the Top Ten on Twitter locally and internationally in every appearance he made during the contest which earned him the nickname "The Trending Boy".

A week before the grand finals, Juan returned to compete for the Wildcard Edition. He battled against Arlen Gaspar from Brazil and won the round. Wildcard winners were called the "Manlalaban" who will face the first, second and third weekly winners.

During the "You're My Foreignoy" grand finals where Gui Adorno won, Juan was once again awarded the Dabarkad's Choice Award for having a total of over 8,000 likes on Eat Bulaga!s Facebook poll. This poll clearly showed that he was the most popular among the "foreignoys" that competed in the grand finals.

Eat Bulaga host
After winning the Dabarkad's Choice Award, Juan has been visible in several shows on the GMA Network. He was interviewed by Ryzza Mae Dizon in The Ryzza Mae Show along with his fellow 'You're My Foreignoy' winners, Gui Adorno and Diego Furoni. He also hosted the waterfalls segment during the Summer Special episode of Kapuso Mo, Jessica Soho and later returned as a celebrity guest along with Gui Adorno on its Fiesta segment the following month at Obando in Bulacan.

Juan also guested in some GMA News TV shows such as Brigada, iJuander, Day Off and Mars.

Hwan hosted Eat Bulaga!s "Dabarkad's Pinoy Henyo" segment for five months in 2014.

Pinoy Big Brother (PBB)

Juan was a part of ABS-CBN's reality show Pinoy Big Brother: 737 as a regular housemate, and eliminated in week 17 (day 119), placing him final 6.

In 2020, Richard joined Pinoy Big Brother: Connect as one of the new digital hosts, and hosts the show's online updates. This continued with his time in Pinoy Big Brother: Kumunity Season 10 in 2021.

UPFRONT at the UAAP

Juan became part of ABS-CBN Sports + Action's UAAP coverage show called UPFRONT at the UAAP. He is one of the new male hosts (alongside Justin Quirino and Marco Gumabao) that was introduced in the second part of UAAP Season 78.

Acting
Besides hosting and modelling, Juan also started to act in 2017. He played the male lead in TV5's Wattpad Presents: AFGITMOLFM and GMA's Tadhana: Karayom in 2017 and 2018 respectively.

In 2020, Richard made a comeback to Philippine television as he plays Richie Tan, in the afternoon soap opera, Love Thy Woman, on ABS-CBN.

In 2022, on his first starring role in a film, he co-starred in the online romantic comedy movie Connected with former Pinoy Big Brother: Connect housemates Kobie Brown, Andi Abaya, Ralph Malibunas, Gail Banawis, Chico Alicaya, and Amanda Zamora.

Philippines and beyond

In 2018, Juan have been involved in many international projects. In early 2018, he interviewed the cast of Marvel's Avengers: Infinity War in Singapore. Later on that year, he has also had the chance to interview legendary fashion designer, Sir Paul Smith and celebrity Chef Gordon Ramsay. He also went to Seoul Fashion Week S/S19 to shoot a special with the OTT platform, Viu.

In 2019, Richard was one of the 3 regional artists who was tapped by TVN Asia to star in a show called Create My Seoul, alongside Korean stars, Sandara Park and Joon Park. He attended Thom Browne’s runway show for the Paris Fashion Week.

Awards and nominations

Filmography

Film

Television

Music video appearances

References

External links
 
 

Filipino people of Chinese descent
ABS-CBN personalities
GMA Network personalities
Star Magic
Hong Kong expatriates in the Philippines
People educated at Island School
Living people
Pinoy Big Brother contestants
University of the Philippines Diliman alumni
1992 births